Rachel Irene Benshoof Seibert, Ph.G., (September 3, 1876 - November 29, 1967) was a clubwoman.

Early life
Rachel Irene Benshoof was born in Blue Grass, Iowa, on September 3, 1876, the daughter of Jacob "Jake" A. Benshoof (1831-1926) and Mary Ann Dougherty (1839-1890).

Seibert was a teacher and took up the study of pharmacy and was a Graduate in Pharmacy at the University of Washington.

Career
Seibert was active in social, church, civic and club affairs. 

She served on several of the organizations of which she was a member, as president and secretary. She was State Treasurer of the Chehalis Business and Professional Women's Club.

She founded the Seibert Sunday School Map plan. 

She was a member of P.E.O. Sisterhood, Delphine Society, Seattle Browning Society, Woman's Century, Music and Art Foundation, Classic Culture, Sororia Women's City Club.

Personal life
Rachel Seibert moved to Washington in 1918. She lived at 305 Bellevue, N., Seattle, Washington.

She married David Allen Seibert (September 13, 1881 - August 7, 1956).

She died on November 29, 1967, in California.

References

1876 births
1967 deaths
University of Washington School of Pharmacy alumni
People from Blue Grass, Iowa
Clubwomen